Coux may refer to the following communes in France:

Coux, Ardèche, in the Ardèche département 
Coux, Charente-Maritime, in the Charente-Maritime département
Coux-et-Bigaroque, in the Dordogne département